Terry Jeffrey could refer to: 

Terence P. Jeffrey, American journalist and commentator
Terry Mike Jeffrey, American musician